Old Gringo is a 1989 American romantic adventure film starring Jane Fonda, Gregory Peck, and Jimmy Smits. It was directed by Luis Puenzo and co-written with Aída Bortnik, based on the 1985 novel The Old Gringo by Mexican novelist Carlos Fuentes.

The film was screened out of competition at the 1989 Cannes Film Festival.

Plot
American schoolteacher Harriet Winslow goes to Mexico to work as a governess for the Miranda family, and becomes caught up in the Mexican revolution. Mexicans transporting her from Chihuahua, secretly soldiers of Pancho Villa's army, use her luggage to smuggle weapons to the servants at the Miranda hacienda. The servants in turn aid the attacking revolutionary army of General Tomas Arroyo. During the attack, a sardonic "Old Gringo", American author Ambrose Bierce, joins the fighting on the side of the revolutionaries; he operates a railway switch that sends a railroad flatcar laden with explosives to its target.

After the Miranda hacienda is taken, Winslow becomes romantically attracted alternately to Bierce and then Arroyo. Bierce has come to Mexico to die in anonymity; he feels that his fifty years as a writer have won him praise only for his style, not for the truth that he's tried to tell. Arroyo, by contrast, has returned to the hacienda where he was born. His father was a Miranda who had raped his peasant mother. Later in his youth, Arroyo murdered his father.

While his army enjoys previously unknown luxuries on the war-damaged palatial estate, Arroyo becomes obsessed with his past. Transfixed by childhood memories of his family buried there, he fails to move his army when ordered by Villa. To bring Arroyo to his senses and avert a mutiny of his officers, Bierce burns papers that the illiterate Arroyo considers sacred—papers that supposedly entitle the peasants to the hacienda land. Arroyo responds by shooting Bierce in the back, killing him. Bierce dies in Winslow's arms.

Winslow goes to the U.S. embassy in Mexico to claim Bierce's body and bring it back to the United States. She claims that he was her long-lost father. This puts Villa in a predicament because a U.S. citizen was murdered by one of his generals. Wishing to avoid American meddling in the revolution, he has Winslow sign a statement that her father had joined the revolution and was executed for disobeying orders, as was General Arroyo who had shot him, and that she witnessed both executions. She signs the statement, is provided with the coffin bearing Bierce's body, and witnesses the execution of Arroyo.

Cast

Production
Ennio Morricone was hired to compose the music for the film but left shortly after accepting, because he agreed to work on Cinema Paradiso instead after reading the script proposed by producer Franco Cristaldi.

Reception
Before its release in theatres, the film was booed at the Cannes film festival.

Roger Ebert in the Chicago Sun-Times said: "There is a potentially wonderful story at the heart of Old Gringo, but the movie never finds it--the screenplay blasts away in every direction except the bulls-eye. ... It's heavy on disconnected episodes, light on drama and storytelling." Janet Maslin in the New York Times said: "... the film's version of romance is no less aimless than its battle scenes. ... The sly, cantankerous character of Ambrose Bierce, an aged cynic surprised and delighted to find himself vibrantly alive and at last in control of his own destiny, reveals in Mr. Peck something vigorous and new." On Rotten Tomatoes the film has an approval rating of 46% based on reviews from 13 critics. Audiences surveyed by CinemaScore gave the film a grade B on scale of A to F.

The film was a box-office failure.

Jane Fonda received a Razzie Award nomination for Worst Actress for her performance in the film, where she ended up losing to Heather Locklear for The Return of Swamp Thing.

References

External links
 
 
 

1989 films
1980s adventure films
1980s romance films
Columbia Pictures films
Films based on Mexican novels
Films directed by Luis Puenzo
Films scored by Lee Holdridge
Mexican Revolution films
1980s English-language films
American war films
American romance films
American adventure films
1980s American films